Springer Farm may refer to:

Springer Farm (Newark, Delaware), listed on the NRHP in Delaware
Springer Farm (Uniontown, Pennsylvania), listed on the NRHP in Pennsylvania